Robert Heinz (– 23 September 1972) was a German football manager. He managed VfL Trier, Eintracht Trier 05, the Luxembourg national football team and AZ Alkmaar.

References

 

Year of birth missing
1972 deaths
German football managers
Luxembourg national football team managers
AZ Alkmaar managers
German expatriate football managers
German expatriate sportspeople in Luxembourg
Expatriate football managers in Luxembourg
German expatriate sportspeople in the Netherlands
Expatriate football managers in the Netherlands
20th-century German people